Ngoila, also spelled Ngoyla and Ngoida, is a village in the East Province of Cameroon, located at 2.617° N, 14.017° E. The primary ethnic group is the Njem. Ngoila is the capital of the Ngoila subdivision of the Haut-Nyong division.

See also
Communes of Cameroon

References 

"Ngoila" at Tageo.com. Accessed 24 May 2006.

Populated places in East Region (Cameroon)